Grassboarding is a sport that has been invented in Costa Rica by Omer Villalobos Villar since 1990. A patent was presented to the local Intellectual Property Office in 1995. It uses a special concave board designed for use over a grass hill.

It belongs to the same family as surfing, snowboarding and sand boarding. It doesn't use any wheels, which makes it different from skateboarding or all-terrain skate boarding (ATS)  or mountain boarding.

References
 
  

Boardsports